Medallions (the original Polish title: Medaliony) is a book consisting of eight short stories by the Polish author Zofia Nałkowska.

The book was originally published in 1946, soon after the end of World War II. In it, Nałkowska calmly related selected stories of Nazi atrocities in Poland and the fates of their victims. Nałkowska was a member of a special committee for the investigation of Nazi crimes that took place in Poland, where she had learned facts directly from victims and witnesses.

Part of the text was published in English in the Introduction to Modern Polish Literature edited by Adam Gillon and Ludwik Krzyżanowski. A complete translation by Diana Kuprel was published by the Northwestern University Press in 2000.

See also
 Holocaust
 Nazi crimes against ethnic Poles
 Rudolf Spanner

References

External links
 Introduction to Modern Polish Literature (Paperback) by Adam Gillon (Editor),  including review.
 Zofia Nałkowska’s ‘Medallions’ & The Bomb That Never Went Off from Culture.pl

1946 short story collections
Books about World War II
Polish short story collections
Northwestern University Press books